The Abilene Reflector-Chronicle is a daily newspaper in Abilene, Kansas with a circulation of about 3,000. The newspaper also maintains an online presence. It is a union of the Abilene Daily Chronicle (founded 1933) and the Abilene Daily Reflector (founded 1888).

In October 2012, Junction City, Kansas-based Montgomery Communications purchased the Reflector-Chronicle from Cleveland Newspapers of Birmingham, Alabama. In March 2016, the White Corporation, whose flagship publication is the Emporia Gazette, purchased the Montgomery papers, including the Reflector-Chronicle.

See also
 List of newspapers in Kansas

References

External links
 The Abilene Reflector-Chronicle official website

Newspapers published in Kansas
Dickinson County, Kansas